is a railway station in Shūnan, Yamaguchi, Japan, operated by JR West and is a stopping point for the San'yō Shinkansen and the San'yō Main Line, and serves as the western terminus of Gantoku Line. It is located in central Shūnan, with the Tokuyama Port and the city office within walking distance.

Layout
The station has five regular tracks (for the Sanyō Main Line and the Gantoku Line) and two Shinkansen tracks, with two side platforms and one island platform serving the Sanyō Main Line, and part of one island platform serving the Gantoku line. These are located on the north east side of the station. The Shinkansen tracks are elevated and located on the south west side of the station.
Each of the platforms is connected by an overpass at the southeast end of the station.

Platforms

Adjacent stations

 █ Sanyō Main Line
 Kushigahama - Tokuyama - Shinnan'yō
 █ Gantoku Line
 Kushigahama - Tokuyama

History

September 25, 1897: Station opens
December 1, 1906: Station is transferred to Japanese National Railways as a part of railway nationalization
December 1, 1934: Gantoku Line begins operation
September, 1969: Present station building begins to be used
March 10, 1975: The San'yō Shinkansen stops here for the first time
April 1, 1987: Station operation is taken over by JR West after privatization of Japanese National Railways

Famous Ekiben
 Anago-meshi - kabayaki eel over rice

See also
 List of railway stations in Japan

External links

  

Railway stations in Japan opened in 1897
Sanyō Main Line
Sanyō Shinkansen
Hiroshima City Network
Railway stations in Yamaguchi Prefecture
Shūnan, Yamaguchi